Lithuania will competed at the 2011 Winter Universiade in Erzurum, Turkey.

Biathlon

Women

Figure skating

References

2011 in Lithuanian sport
Nations at the 2011 Winter Universiade
Lithuania at the Winter Universiade